The Peace Research Institute Frankfurt (acronym: PRIF, German: Leibniz-Institut Hessische Stiftung Friedens- und Konfliktforschung, short HSFK) is a research institute in Frankfurt am Main focused on violent international and internal conflicts and research of conditions for and promotion of the concept of peace. With over 90 employees (as of 2019), PRIF is one of the largest peace research institutes in Germany.

The think tank for peace research and international relations was founded as an independent foundation under public law by the Hesse state government in 1970. PRIF conducts knowledge-oriented basic research, analyses the causes of violent international and internal conflicts, and also carries out research on the conditions necessary for peace.

One of PRIF's most essential tasks involves making the findings of the institute’s basic research on the causes of conflicts and violence useful for the practice of promoting and securing peace. PRIF provides knowledge and recommendations to public institutions and policy makers.

The research institute's library is open to the public and has an extensive collection of specialised literature on peace and conflict research. The institute cooperates with higher education institutions and has especially close links to Goethe University Frankfurt and Technische Universität Darmstadt.

Research departments 

Central research topics and perspectives include:
 Arms control, disarmament and non-proliferation
 International organizations, international law and normative orders
 Non-state violent actors, transnational corporations, civil society
 Radicalization and political violence
 Intrastate conflicts, organization and transformation of political rule
 Globalization and local life-worlds

Research at PRIF is mainly structured by its research programmes. With its programme-bound research, PRIF combines basic research that involves scholars from throughout the institute with applied research and its practical implementation.
Since 2018, the Institute's "Peace and Coercion" research programme has focused on the ambivalent relationship between coercion and the establishment and maintenance of peace.

Organization 
The Executive Director of the PRIF is Nicole Deitelhoff. Other members of the Executive Board are Christopher Daase, Susanne Boetsch, Peter Kreuzer, Sabine Mannitz and Jonas Wolff.

The Research Council is a body that includes all PRIF scholars. It makes decisions on the overall research programme and on projects of individual research departments.

The Board of Trustees, consisting of Hesse’s Prime Minister, the Minister for Science and the Arts, and the Finance Minister of Hesse, three other public figures and three elected representatives from within the institute, supervises the management of the institute and approves its budget.

The Advisory Board supports the PRIF on the design and implementation of the institute's research programs. Four-year terms are by appointment of the Board of Trustees, which is made up of eight scholars from Germany and abroad. 

In 2009 PRIF became a member institute of the Leibniz Association.

Publications 
PRIF publishes monographs and anthologies in cooperation with Springer Verlag in the series Studien der Hessischen Stiftung Friedens- und Konfliktforschung. Subject to an external review process, the series features basic research findings from the Institute, contributions to the peace and security discourse, and working papers and publications prepared for PRIF’s scholarly conferences. In addition, about 10 PRIF Reports are published annually, analysing the background and developments of political events. The four-page PRIF Spotlights are intended for a broader general readership interested in peace and security issues. The PRIF Working Papers are published online on an ad hoc basis and are intended to provide insight into current basic research and stimulate scholarly exchange. The publications are available for download online and print versions are available at numerous libraries.

Since 2018, the publications have been supplemented online by the PRIF Blog, on which PRIF researchers discuss short texts on current issues and debates relevant to peace and conflict research.

In addition to its own series, PRIF publishes the Peace Report annually together with the Bonn International Centre for Conversion (BICC), the Institute for Peace Research and Security Policy (IFSH) and the Institute for Development and Peace (INEF). The reports have also been available for download online since 2018.

References

External links
 

Peace and conflict studies
Research institutes in Germany
Think tanks based in Germany
Organisations based in Frankfurt
Research institutes of international relations